The list of shipwrecks in 2013 includes ships sunk, foundered, grounded, or otherwise lost during 2013.

January

3 January

9 January

11 January

14 January

15 January

17 January

18 January

19 January

21 January

26 January

30 January

31 January

February

4 February

5 February

7 February

12 February

15 February

17 February

21 February

23 February

27 February

Unknown date

March

6 March

7 March

9 March

10 March

11 March

16 March

18 March

19 March

24 March

30 March

April

2 April

7 April

8 April

12 April

13 April

14 April

17 April

25 April

28 April

29 April

May

3 May

7 May

12 May

26 May

28 May

30 May

June

4 June

7 June

10 June

11 June

13 June

14 June

17 June

19 June

20 June

22 June

23 June

24 June

25 June

29 June

July

1 July

4 July

6 July

8 July

10 July

11 July

12 July

14 July

15 July

16 July

20 July

23 July

24 July

31 July

August

1 August

7 August

8 August

9 August

12 August

13 August

14 August

16 August

18 August

19 August

22 August

28 August

September

3 September

6 September

7 September

8 September

9 September

10 September

12 September

17 September

20 September

23 September

27 September

29 September

October

1 October

3 October

4 October

7 October

11 October

12 October

13 October

14 October

15 October

17 October

19 October

20 October

28 October

30 October

November

1 November

2 November

3 November

5 November

6 November

8 November

9 November

10 November

11 November

22 November

24 November

25 November

27 November

30 November

December

6 December

11 December

14 December

17 December

20 December

23 December

24 December

25 December

27 December

29 December

Unknown date

Unknown date

References

2013
 
Ship